Gharnati (Arabic: الغرناطي) refers to an Algerian variety of Andalusian classical music originating in Tlemcen. Its name is derived from the Arabic name of the city of Granada. Gharnati has also become an established tradition in other cities in western Algeria, such as Oran and Sidi-Bel-Abbès. In the 20th century it also spread to Morocco after being brought over by Algerian families who moved there fleeing French colonial rule in Algeria, and eventually founding conservatories in cities like Oujda and Rabat.

Features

Modes 
The modes (arabic : طبوع : tūbūb') that are known in the school of Tlemcen are the following:

 Mawwāl (الموال)
 Mawwāl (الموال)
 Dīl (الذيل)
 Raṣd ə-Dīl (رصد الذيل)
 Māya (الماية)
 Zīdān (الزيدان)
 Zīdān (الزيدان)
 Raml əl-ʿAšiyya (رمل العشية)
 Mǧənba (المجنبة)
 Raml əl-Māya (رمل الماية)
 Raml əl-Māya (رمل الماية)
 Raṣd (الرصد)
 'Iraq Maṭlūq (العراق المطلوق)
 'Iraq Maṭlūq (العراق المطلوق)
 Ḥsīn (الحسين)
 Ġrībat əl-Ḥsīn (غريبة الحسين)
 Məzmūm (المزموم)
 Məzmūm (المزموم)
 Sīkā (السيكاه)
 Sīkā (السيكاه)
 Ǧārkā (الجاركاه)
 Ǧārkā (الجاركاه)
 ‘Irāq Maḥṣūr (العراق المحصور)
 ‘Irāq Maḥṣūr (العراق المحصور)
 Ġrīb (الغريب)

The nuba 
In Tlemcen, a nuba is a musical composition consisting of an ordered suite of vocal and instrumental pieces built around five movements whose rhythm progresses from very slow to very light and which are divided into two theoretical parts, the first comprising the first three movements (mṣeddar, bṭāyḥī and derǧ) and the second, the last two (inṣirāf and meẖles).

The structure of a typical nuba:

 Mšālyā : an unmeasured instrumental prelude that introduces and develops the main mode and neighboring modes used in its development. It also introduces the audience into its mood and plays the role of a rhythmic introduction to the tūšiyya.
 Tūšiyya : instrumental ouverture composed of several patterns (each repeated once) in which follow a series of rhythmic signatures recalling the five movements that form the nuba.
 Rhythmic cycle (mîzān) : ( = 110)
 Mîzān əl-bašraf ǧwāb "instrumental"
 Mîzān əl-inqilāb
 Mîzān əl-qṣîd ǧwāb "instrumental"
 Mîzān əl-inṣirāf / əl-meẖles
 Mšālyā : (see above)
 Kūrsi al-mṣeddar : a melodic and rhythmic pattern that introduces the first movement.
 Rhythmic cycle (mîzān) :
 Mîzān əl-qṣîd ǧwāb "instrumental"
 Kūrsi al-mṣedrayn : a melodic and rhythmic pattern that separates two mṣeddar-s.
 Mṣeddar (first movement) : vocal and instrumental piece (one or more).
 Rhythmic cycle (mîzān) :
 Singing : mîzān əl-qṣîd qūl
 Instrumental answer : mîzān əl-qṣîd ǧwāb
 Kūrsi al-bṭāyḥī : a melodic and rhythmic pattern that introduces the second movement.
 Rhythmic cycle (mîzān) :
 Mîzān əl-bašraf ǧwāb "instrumental"
 Bṭāyḥī (second movement) : vocal and instrumental piece (one or more).
 Rhythmic cycle (mîzān) :
 Singing : mîzān əl-bašraf qūl
 Instrumental answer : mîzān əl-bašraf ǧwāb
 Kūrsi əl -derǧ : a melodic and rhythmic pattern that introduces the third movement.
 Rhythmic cycle (mîzān) :
 Mîzān əl-derǧ
 Derǧ (third movement) : vocal and instrumental piece (one or more).
 Rhythmic cycle (mîzān) :
 Mîzān əl-derǧ
 Istiḥbār : Unmeasured vocal improvisation where the musician displays his inspiration and his virtuosity.
 Tūšiyyet əl-inṣirāfāt : instrumental interlude introducing the fourth movement (inṣirāf). In its absence, the kūrsi əl-inṣirāf takes its place.
 Rhythmic cycle (mîzān) :
 Mîzān əl-inṣirāf
 Inṣirāf (fourth movement) : vocal and instrumental piece (one or more).
 Rhythmic cycle (mîzān) :
 Mîzān əl-inṣirāf
 Meẖles (fifth movement) : vocal and instrumental piece (one or more).
 Rhythmic cycle (mîzān) :
 Mîzān əl-meẖles
 Tūšiyyet əl -kamāl : Instrumental piece ending the nuba. It may also serve to introduce another nuba.

Nubat əl-inqilābāt 
It is a suite composed of vocal and instrumental pieces (Muwashshah and zajal) in which different modes and rhythmic cycles follow one another (mîzān əl-qṣîd ǧwāb (8/4), mīzān ə-sofyān (7/4), mîzān əl-bašrāf ǧwāb (4/4) and bašrāf qūl (8/4), mîzān əl-Gūbbāḥī (4/4) and mîzān əl-inṣirāf (6/8)).

Slisla 
Slisla refers to a kind of nubat əl-inqilābāt in which pieces (inqilābāt) evolve in the same rhythmic cycle (mīzān), such as slislet mîzān əl-qṣîd, slislet mīzān ə-ṣofyān, slislet mīzān əl-bašraf or slislet mīzān əl-inṣirāf. Each slisla begins with a mšālyā and a tūšiyya, and ends with a meẖles.

Qadriyya 
It is a small vocal piece composed in a mîzān əl-inṣirāf often used to close a classical nuba.
Qadriyya-s are found in seven modes including mawwāl, zīdān, ğārkā, raml əl-Māya, ‘Irāq and sīkā.

Representative artists

Algeria

Composers 
 Mohamed ibn al-Khamis (1252-1369)
 Abou Hammou Moussa II (1324-1388), the eighth sultan of the zayyanid dynasty.
 Ibn al-Banna a-Tilimsani 14th century
 Abi Djamaa Talalisi (1330-?), the doctor-poet of the zayyanid dynasty court.
 Abou Othmane Said El Mendassi (1583-1677)
 Ahmed al-Bekri (17th century)
 Ibn Nachit (17th century)
 Ahmed Ben Triki (1650-1750)
 Abou Abdillah Mohamed Ben Ahmed Ben Msayeb (1688-1768)
 Moulay Ahmed Ben Antar (18th century)
 Mohamed Bendebbah a-Tilimsani (18th century)
 Mohamed Touati (18th century)
 M’barek Bouletbaq (18th century-1768)
 Boumediene Bensahla (18th century-1797)

Great masters and famous performers

Current celebrities 
 Amina Karadja
 Anis Amanallah Kalfat
 Badr Eddine Khaldoun
 Brahim Hadj Kacem
 Dalila Mekadder
 Karim Boughazi
 Khalil Baba Ahmed
 Nisrine Ghenim
 Nouri Kouffi
 Rym Hakiki
 Larbi Louazani
 Leila Benmrah
 Lila Borsali

Morocco

Famous performers 
 Bouchnak Benyounes dit Afendi
 Cheikh Mohammed Salah Chaabane
 Chaabane Sidi Mohammed
 Chaabane Nasreddine
 Kerzazi Cheikh Brahim
 Amina Alaoui

France 
 Françoise Atlan

Notes and references

Algerian music